Adamstown Oval is a suburban association football venue located in Newcastle, New South Wales, Australia. It is used by Adamstown Rosebuds, Newcastle Jets Women's and Newcastle Jets Youth.

References

Newcastle Jets FC
Soccer venues in New South Wales
Sport in Newcastle, New South Wales
Sports venues in New South Wales
A-League Women stadiums